Hawksley House is an apartment building in Sunderland, Tyne and Wear, England. It is designated by English Heritage as a Grade II listed building.

History
Designed by Sunderland-born brothers William and Thomas Ridley Milburn, the building was completed in 1907 as offices for the Sunderland and South Shields Water Company.  It has recently been converted into apartments, at which time it gained its present name, after Thomas Hawksley and Charles Hawksley, father and son civil engineers who were associated with water related projects in Sunderland.

Architecture

The building was constructed in Penrith red sandstone and ashlar with a Lakeland slate roof. The exterior design is neoclassical and features Ionic porches, Tuscan window bays, architraves and dentilled cornices.

The interior features a baroque, open stairwell with a glazed dome and high relief swags. The neoclassical design is repeated in the former board room, which has stucco wall panels and Ionic columns and pilasters.

Sources

Grade II listed buildings in Tyne and Wear
Buildings and structures in the City of Sunderland
Sunderland